S.I.I.T. or SIIT is an abbreviation for:

IT-related
Stateless IP/ICMP Translation, a means for interworking different versions of the Internet Protocol
Standardization and Innovation in Information Technology (an academic conference by IEEE)

Colleges and Universities
Sajjad Institute of Information Technology (India)
Saskatchewan Indian Institute of Technologies (Canada)
School of Industrial and Information Technology (Mindanao, Philippines)
Scholars Institute of Information Technology (New Delhi, India)
Shandong International Institution of Translation (China)
Sirindhorn International Institute of Technology, Thammasat University (Thailand)
South Institute of Information Technology (Pakistan)
Suzhou Institute of Industrial Technology (China)
Systematic Institute of Information Technology (Malaysia)

Others
 Significant Incident Investigation Team (Los Angeles Fire Department)